Qaravəlli (also, Karavelli and Kora-Velly) is a village and municipality in the Shamakhi Rayon of Azerbaijan.  It has a population of 1,146.

References 

Populated places in Shamakhi District